Rob Mercer, an IT consultant is a member of the Legislative Council of the Isle of Man, having been elected on 12 March 2020

Parliamentary positions
 Chair of the Environment & Infrastructure Policy Review Committee, Nov 2021–Present
 Member of the Tynwald Management Committee, 2020–present
 Member of the Standing Committee on the Business and Functioning of the Council, 2020–present
 Member of the Tynwald Standards and Members Interests Committee, 2020–present

Previous Parliamentary positions
 Member of the Environment & Infrastructure Policy Review Committee, 2020–Oct 2021

References

Year of birth missing (living people)
Place of birth missing (living people)
Members of the Legislative Council of the Isle of Man
Living people